The Little Ajo Mountains is a mountain range in southern Arizona, in extreme western Pima County, Arizona. The city of Ajo sits on the northeast of this small mountain range. Both the mountain range and city take their name from the Spanish word for garlic.

Ajo, is in the center-east of the range, and is famous for the New Cornelia open pit copper mine located in the Little Ajo Mountains.

Cardigan Peak at  lies in the main mountain mass to the west of Ajo. Camelback Mountain at  lies just south of Ajo and overlooks the New Cornelia pit just to the east.

The Batamote Mountains lie to the northeast, the Pozo Redondo Mountains lie to the east, Bates Mountains and the Ajo Range lie to the south and the Growler Mountains lie to the west.
The Barry M. Goldwater Air Force Range lies to the north and west of the mountains and the Cabeza Prieta National Wildlife Refuge also lies to the west.

Valleys surrounding the Little Ajos 
Drainage from the north and northeast side of the Little Ajo Mountains enters Tenmile Wash which flows northwest to enter Childs Valley. The southwest side of the range drains into Daniels Arroyo which flows northwest to also enter Childs Valley. The southeast side of the range drains to the south in the Cuerda de Leña in the Valley of the Ajo and turns west around the south end of the Growler Mountains to join the northwest draining Growler Valley.

Access to the mountains 

See also 
 List of mountain ranges of Arizona

References

Mountain ranges of the Sonoran Desert
Mountain ranges of Pima County, Arizona
Mountain ranges of Arizona